The South Plateau languages, also known as Jilic–Eggonic, are spoken in central Nigeria. Eggon has 150,000 speakers and Jili (Lijili, Mijili) perhaps 100,000.

Classification
Jilic (Koro) and Eggonic are clearly valid groups. Their connection was proposed in Blench (2006, 2008).

Two additional languages, Koro Nulu (a.k.a. Koro Ija) and Koro Zuba (collectively known as "Ija-Zuba") are ethnically Koro. However, they have very low lexical similarity with each other (~ 7%), and Koro Zuba at least appears to be a Nupoid language.

Names and locations
Below is a list of language names, populations, and locations from Blench (2019).

References

Blench (2008) Prospecting proto-Plateau. Manuscript.

External links
Roger Blench: South Plateau materials
Plateau materials from Roger Blench

 
Plateau languages